Baron Wallace may refer to:

 Thomas Wallace, 1st Baron Wallace (1768–1844), English politician 
 George Wallace, Baron Wallace of Coslany (1906–2003), British Labour Party politician
 William Wallace, Baron Wallace of Saltaire (born 1941), British academic, writer and politician 
 Jim Wallace, Baron Wallace of Tankerness (born 1954), British politician and former leader of the Scottish Liberal Democrats

Wallace
Wallace
Wallace